The Christmas Ornament is a 2013 American/Canadian holiday romance television film directed by Mark Jean and starring Kellie Martin, Cameron Mathison, and Jewel Staite. Written by Bill Wells and J. B. White, the film is about a young widow unable to celebrate Christmas because of the memories that it evokes, until she meets a Christmas tree shop owner who helps her start her own cookie business and rediscover the spirit of the season.

Plot
A young widow, Kathy (Kellie Martin), is not putting up a Christmas tree this year. For years, she and her recently deceased husband gave each other Christmas ornaments as gifts that represented their love for each other. Now she keeps those ornaments locked away in order to avoid memories of her tragic loss. The only holiday tradition she observes now is baking Christmas cookies for her friends, which she's been doing since childhood.

Shortly before Christmas, Kathy meets a handsome Christmas tree shop owner, Tim (Cameron Mathison), who tries to sell her a tree, but is initially unsuccessful. The two are attracted to each other, and soon she accepts a tree from him as a gift, as well as an ornament that symbolizes hope for her. She helps him deliver his trees, and he helps her start a new cookie business—something she's always dreamed of doing—and brings the joy of the Christmas season back into her life.

Supported by her best friend, Jenna (Jewel Staite), and her newfound feelings of love for Tim, Kathy starts to accept the message of hope symbolized by Tim's ornament. Their relationship, however, is complicated by her memories of her husband and by Tim's ex-girlfriend, Rebecca, who comes back into his life unexpectedly. As Christmas approaches, they come to realize how much their love means to each other and their future together.

Cast

Release
The Christmas Ornament first aired on the Hallmark Channel on November 16, 2013.

Critical response
In her review for the DVD Verdict website, Dawn Hunt gave the film a positive notice, writing that it combines the joys of Christmas with a gradually developing love story. The film's effectiveness, according to Hunt, is due to the chemistry of the leading actors and the performances of a strong supporting cast. Hunt concluded:

References

External links
 
 

2013 television films
2013 films
2013 romantic drama films
American Christmas drama films
American romantic drama films
Canadian Christmas drama films
Canadian romantic drama films
Canadian drama television films
English-language Canadian films
Films shot in British Columbia
Hallmark Channel original films
2010s Christmas films
2010s English-language films
Films directed by Mark Jean
2010s Canadian films
2010s American films